Lingkod ng Mamamayan ng Valenzuela City, also known as team BTS or Bagong direksyon sa Tamanag Serbisyo is a local party in Valenzuela City, in the Philippines, headed by former Valenzuela's 2nd district representative Magi Gunigundo.

LINKOD participated on 2022 Valenzuela local elections headed by Bombit Bernardo who ran for mayoralty but he lost against his rival Wes Gatchalian. Magi Gunigundo seek for another term as Valenzuela's 2nd district representative but lost against his rival incumbent Valenzuela's 2nd district representative Eric Martinez. Neither of the members won the local election.

On 2022 Philippine general election, there was a party-list called BTS or Bayaning Tsuper party-list which is not associated to this political party. However, BTS party-list failed to win any congressional seat.

Electoral Performance

Legislative

House of Representatives

City Council

References 

Politics of Valenzuela, Metro Manila
Political parties in Metro Manila